Hollinger of Sweden - Swedish: Holmger - may refer to:

Hollinger Philipson, Swedish prince about 1190, father of King Canute II
Holmger Knutsson, Swedish prince about 1210